Arallu is an Israeli extreme metal band. As one of the members of the Jerusalem extreme metal scene, Arallu has "thrived off the seeming contradiction of its location within a 'holy' city."

History

Arallu was created as the solo project of Moti "Butchered" Daniel, a bass guitarist who has performed live with Melechesh. The debut album The War on the Wailing Wall arrived in 2001 and featured "a drum machine programmed to ludicrous speed". In 2002, Arallu released their "iconoclastic" second album Satanic War in Jerusalem. Nir Nakav from the band Salem was responsible for the drums and the traditional goblet drum while Daniel performed on all other instruments and vocals. The album featured a cover version of Slayer's "Evil Has No Boundaries". Daniel expanded the band's line-up after the release of this album and a DVD Visual Chaos Invasion was released in the following year.

In September 2003, Daniel's brother was kidnapped and held to ransom by guerrillas from the Colombian organisation Ejército de Liberación Nacional. Daniel was successful in negotiating for his brother's release.

The year 2005 saw the release of Arallu's third album The Demon From The Ancient World with guest performers from various Israeli acts including Zeev Tananboim of Salem. Daniel returned the favor with a guest performance on Salem's chart-topping Strings Attached album.

In September 2007, Arallu opened for Mayhem's concert in Tel Aviv. . Their fourth album Desert Battles - Descending to the Sands was released in 2009.  The footage from the performance was filmed and is scheduled for release in 2010 as the band's second DVD "The Ultimate War".

In January 2008, Arallu was interviewed for the metal movie Global Metal by Sam Dunn.

On August 28, 2009, the band was the opening act for Behemoth on their show at the Barby club in Tel Aviv, along with Arafel.

In September 2011, the band went on their first European tour, playing five dates between September 9–13, 2011, in Germany, Switzerland and Austria.

In October 2012, the band went on their second European tour, playing 5 dates between October 19–28 in Austria, Switzerland and Hungary 
Between October 22–25, the band recorded a new single, "Desert Genii Storm", in Sourmash Studio in Switzerland; it was produced by Dave Snow in May 2013 the band open for Enlsaved at riding Tel Aviv, October 2013 the band went their third European tour playing 8 Dates between October 18– November 3 in Austria, Hungary, Switzerland and Germany.

Style
Arallu performs black metal with oriental influences and touches of thrash metal. Critic Roberto Marinelli describes their style as "reminiscent of early Venom, Sodom, and Voivod: thrashy, monochromatic, underproduced and full of ideas that far outstrip their abilities". Daniel has remarked in an interview that Arallu's style has to be oriental, thrashy and barbaric "all at once".

Band members
Moti "Butchered" Daniel - lead vocals, bass (1997–present) drum programming (1997-2001), guitars (1997-2003)
Gal "Pixel" Cohen - guitars, backing vocals (2007–present)
Omri Yagen - guitars (2014–present)
Assaf Kassimov - drums, percussion (2014–present)

Former members
Yonatan Dushnitzki - drums, percussion (2003–2014)
Sergei "Metalheart" Nemichenitser - guitars (2010–2013)
Yossi Darmon - guitars (2004–2010)
Avi Caspi - guitars (1999–2007)
Alex Schuster - guitars (2003–2004)
Ben Fisher - drums, percussion (2001–2003)
Yaniv Zada - "soul beating" doom percussion instruments, wind instrument (2006–2010)

Timeline

Discography

Studio albums
The War on the Wailing Wall (1999, Reissue 2009)
Satanic War in Jerusalem (2002, Reissue 2011)
The Demon from the Ancient World (2005)
Desert Battles - Descending to the Sands (2009)
GENIEWAR (2015)
Six (2017)
En Olam (2019)
Death Covenant (2022)

EPs
At War against God (2001)
Magen Jerusalem 7" (2009)

DVDs
Visual Chaos Invasion (2003)
The Ultimate War (2010)
Middle Eastern Battlefield (2016)

Notes

References

External links
Arallu at Myspace
Interviews and reviews

Oriental metal musical groups
Israeli black metal musical groups
Musical groups established in 1999
Musical quintets
1999 establishments in Israel
Jewish heavy metal musicians